Meluha may refer to:
the land where the Shiva Trilogy of novels is set
Meluhha, a land described in ancient Sumerian texts

See also 
 Melua (surname), a Georgian surname